So-Lo is the debut studio album by American musician Danny Elfman, released in 1984 by MCA Records. Recorded primarily by Elfman, but also featuring the members of his band, Oingo Boingo, it was recorded when Elfman was offered a solo contract with MCA after the band had been dropped from I.R.S. Records. The album marked the band's last release to feature bassist Kerry Hatch and keyboardist Richard Gibbs.

Background
So-Lo was produced during a hiatus for Oingo Boingo, following the departure of Hatch and Gibbs. Elfman described the album as "a chance to experiment with slower tempos"<ref>[http://www.bluntinstrument.org.uk/elfman/archive/Denver86.htm The Elfman Zone - Denver Post Article 1986]</ref> and added that "it was fun to do some ballads and try to snap out of that image that a lot of people have of me just writing real fast (...) tunes."

While much of the instrumentation features synth programming from Elfman, Oingo Boingo's remaining members all performed on the album, with Flea of the then-recently formed Red Hot Chili Peppers providing "additional bass guitar". The track "Lightning" had been recorded in 1983 for Good For Your Soul while Hatch and Gibbs were still with the band.

Despite rumors at the time of the band breaking up, Elfman later stated that So-Lo was "not made out of frustration" and that he was more committed to the group than ever before. However, a 1987 article published in BAM magazine, in which Elfman was interviewed about the band's past, suggested that Oingo Boingo had in fact considered disbanding in 1984.

In 2020, Oingo Boingo guitarist Steve Bartek stated that So-Lo was "mostly a band record", but that MCA "wasn't particularly interested" in Oingo Boingo and so had signed Elfman as a solo artist. However, Elfman wanted to continue the band and convinced MCA to change his recording contract to Oingo Boingo following the release of So-Lo.

Release
Original vinyl and cassette releases contained an alternate, earlier mix of the opening song, "Gratitude". Among other differences, this 5:04 mix included a spoken verse cut from all other versions; this was also the version used on the soundtrack to the film Beverly Hills Cop (1984). The original CD release contained the full 5:12 album mix.

The missing verse is as follows:I used to eat people like you for breakfastI used to fly, high up in the skyI used to chew up rocks and spit out gravelI had a heart as cold as iceThis verse was retained for live performances of the song, sometimes with slightly different lyrics,Boingo at The Palace-Gratitude and was also featured on the re-recording of the song for Boingo Alive in 1988.

The 12-inch single release for "Gratitude" used a shorter 4:42 mix, parenthetically named the "Short Version", and the accompanying music video featured an even shorter 4:08 edit. Confusingly, CD releases erroneously titled the 5:12 album mix as the "Short Version", while later vinyl reissues replaced the album mix with the 12-inch "Short Version".

Reissues
In 2014, Varèse Sarabande reissued So-Lo on CD, with one bonus track. In 2022, Rubellan Remasters announced that they would be issuing a remastered version of So-Lo'' on both colored vinyl and CD, the latter as an expanded edition with five bonus tracks.

Track listing

Personnel
"The Cast"
 Danny Elfman – vocals, percussion, programming
 Steve Bartek – guitars, programming
 Rich Gibbs – synthesizers, special DX-7 programming
 Paul Fox – synthesizers
 Kerry Hatch – basses
 John Hernandez – drums, percussion
 Leon Schneiderman – baritone sax
 Sam Phipps – tenor sax
 Dale Turner – trumpet, trombone

Additional musician
 The liner notes on some versions (including the 2014 CD reissue) list "Special Thanx" to "Michael Flea for his extra bass work."

Technical
 Steve Bartek – co-producer, arrangements
 Danny Elfman – co-producer, arrangements
 Paul Ratajczak – co-producer, engineer
 Spozzi the "Spazz" – assistant engineer
 Laura Engel – production assistant
 Greg Fulginiti – mastering
 Georganne Deen – art direction, illustration
 Aaron Rapoport – photography

References

Danny Elfman albums
Oingo Boingo albums
1984 debut albums
Albums produced by Danny Elfman
Albums produced by Steve Bartek
MCA Records albums